Zelem may refer to: Zeelhem

 Zelem, Limburg, part of Halen, Limburg, Belgium
 Zelem Charterhouse, Carthusian monastery in Zelem
 Zelem Castle, a moated castle in Kranenburg, North Rhine-Westphalia, Germany

People with the surname
 Katie Zelem (born 1996), English footballer
 Natasha Sayce-Zelem (born 1983), English computer scientist
 Peter Zelem (born 1962), English footballer